Stanley Cowie (1890 – August 1927) was an English professional footballer. An inside right, he played in the Football League for Blackpool and was also on the books of Exeter City. His body was "found in the River Tyne with his hands and feet tied with cord" in August 1927.
Cowie's death was ruled "suicide while of unsound mind".

References

1890 births
1927 deaths
Footballers from Newcastle upon Tyne
English footballers
Blackpool F.C. players
Exeter City F.C. players
Barry Town United F.C. players
Association football inside forwards
Suicides by drowning in England
1927 suicides